The pillar wire eel (Saurenchelys stylura) is an eel in the family Nettastomatidae (duckbill/witch eels). It was described by Einar Hagbart Martin Lea in 1913, originally under the genus Leptocephalus. It is a marine, tropical eel which is known from the western Pacific Ocean.

References

Nettastomatidae
Fish described in 1913